Deep Run is a tributary of Alloway Creek in Salem County, New Jersey in the United States.

References

Rivers of New Jersey
Rivers of Salem County, New Jersey